Senator Aguirre may refer to:

Amanda Aguirre (born 1953), Arizona State Senate
Linda Aguirre (born 1951), Arizona State Senate